Arthur Herbert Charlton (29 December 1876 – 24 October 1956) was a Scottish amateur football half back who played in the Football League for Nottingham Forest. He is best remembered for his six years in amateur football with Brentford during the 1890s, captaining the team and being described as "probably the club's first great player". He was posthumously inducted into the Brentford Hall of Fame in 2015.

Personal life 
Charlton left Brentford to complete an apprenticeship in soap making. He later returned to West London served as head of the Brentford Chamber of Commerce from 1932 to 1933 and as mayor of Brentford & Chiswick in 1951. He was also a county councillor, an alderman and chairman and managing director of the Brentford Soap Company. He was made a freeman of the borough in 1954.

Honours
Brentford
 West London Alliance: 1892–93
 West Middlesex Cup: 1894–95
 London League Second Division second-place promotion: 1896–97
 London League First Division second-place promotion: 1897–98
 London Senior Cup: 1897–98
 Middlesex Senior Cup: 1897–98

Individual

 Brentford Hall of Fame

Career statistics

References

1876 births
1956 deaths
Footballers from Paisley, Renfrewshire
Scottish footballers
Association football midfielders
Brentford F.C. players
English Football League players
Mayors of places in Greater London
Nottingham Forest F.C. players
Southern Football League players